Express Avenue (Tamil: எக்ஸ்ப்ரெஸ் அவென்யூ) is a shopping mall in Chennai promoted by Express Infrastructure, A division of Express Newspapers Pvt. Ltd. It is home to the largest gaming arcade in South India. The mall has 10 anchor tenants and 150 vanilla tenants.

Description
The mall is situated near the Royapettah Clock Tower. The mall is built on an 8-acre site inside the historic Indian Express Estate and has four floors of retail space, a building for corporate offices and a hotel. Out of 10 acres, about 3.57 acres have been taken up by buildings. The rest have been used for car parking, drive-ways and landscaping. In all, the mall has 26 lifts, 34 escalators and 4 travelators.

Express Avenue hosts a mixture of shopping, business and leisure. The mall is bounded by Whites Road, Woods Road and Patullos Road and has a three-level basement parking space for over 1,500 cars and a parking area for bikes. It has a total development of  including 900,000 sq ft of retail space, 100,000 sq. ft of hotel, 200,000 sq. ft of office space, 400,000 sq ft of parking space. The mall was inaugurated on 26 May 2010.

E Hotel, a 44-room four-star boutique hotel, was built in the mall at a cost of  300 million.

Entertainment and leisure
The Escape Cinemas, the branch of PVR Cinemas, consists of an 08-screens multiplex with a capacity of 1,600 seats covering , which is the city's largest cineplex. California-based Giovanni Castor played a key role in the overall design of Escape. The mall is home to the largest gaming arcade in South India.

Besides stand-alone stores like Bath & Body Works, Montblac, and Armani Exchange the mall has an  Lifestyle and a 65,000 sq. ft Pantaloon, Smart Bazaar, H&M and Forever 21. The anchor tenants are expected to take 300,000 to 400,000 sq ft, while the vanilla tenants would occupy up to 400,000 sq. ft. The  food court has 25 counters and includes food chains such as Burger King, Taco Bell, KFC and Pizza Hut. The mall has six atria with a height not less than 75 ft each. The atrium areas are covered with tensile fabric and the centre of the atrium is covered with glass.

Food court
The  court, also called EA Garden, has 25 counters with several food and beverage options including Oriental, North Indian, South Indian, American and Italian.

Fun City
Fun City, a prominent attraction of the mall, is a play area for children.

Business chamber
The business chamber is the first such marketing space to be built inside a mall in India.

Parking
The three-level basement parking is equipped to handle about 2,000 vehicles.

Gallery

See also
 Chennai Citi Centre
 Spencer Plaza
 Abhirami Mega Mall
 Ampa Skywalk
 Phoenix Marketcity (Chennai)

References

Shopping malls in Chennai
Shopping malls established in 2010
2010 establishments in Tamil Nadu